Young X-Men was a comic book series published by Marvel Comics. It lasted for 12 issues, from April 2008 through March 2009.  The series was written by Marc Guggenheim.

Plot summary

Final Genesis (Issues 1–5)
Blindfold has a vision of a team of X-Men facing off against a deadly old foe of the X-Men, Donald Pierce, former member of the Hellfire Club. After one of the members is murdered in the ensuing battle, she wakes up violently from the nightmarish dream. Elsewhere, Cyclops is seen across the world, recruiting, several teenaged mutants such as Eric Gitter, and former students like Sooraya Qadir (Dust), Nicholas Gleason (Wolf Cub); and Santo Vaccarro (Rockslide). Santo, however, refuses to join unless Scott accepts Ruth Aldine (Blindfold) whom Scott had originally planned not to recruit, to be on the team as well.

After assembling the Young X-Men in the Danger Cave, he gives them their costumes, which have the appearance of the standard yellow and black training uniforms. He lectures them that he is reforming the X-Men, beginning with perhaps the last generation of mutants. Their first mission is to take down what he claims is the new incarnation of the Brotherhood of Mutants, under the control of Sunspot (who is now Lord Imperial of the Hellfire Club) and is accompanied by his friends and former teammates, Cannonball, Magma, and Danielle Moonstar.

After they fail in training sessions against Brotherhood simulacra, Cyclops decides to send them after Moonstar and Magma in small teams, each with a specific target. When surprise-attacked by Dust, Rockslide and Wolf Cub in Los Angeles, Magma responds violently by destroying their Blackbird. In the Colorado Rockies, Moonstar proves herself superior to the young mutants Blindfold and Ink despite her lack of powers. However, she is taken down by an unseen force that Blindfold seems to know. Carrying the unconscious Moonstar back to their Blackbird, Ink asks Blindfold how her powers work. After she is done explaining, Ink immediately knocks her unconscious. Ink then delivers the unconscious Blindfold to a mysterious man in the shadows who happens to be Donald Pierce. When questioned about why they aren't dead, Ink explains that he is a mercenary not a killer.

Rockslide, Wolf Cub, and Dust recover from their crash and attack Magma. Magma, though unprepared, is much more experienced. She turns Dust into glass, sends Wolf Cub packing, and turns Rockslide into a pile of rocks. Distracted by Rockslide, who reforms, she is eviscerated by Wolf Cub, knocking her out but leaving Wolf Cub with a nasty burn.

Cannonball and Sunspot are watching the battle in LA. After hearing nothing from Danielle, they are convinced that the Young X-Men are coming after them. Graymalkin watches Ink talk to Cyclops in the shadows, Ink having lied about what happened to Blindfold and Moonstar. Graymalkin appears to be talking to himself, knowing something nobody knows. He says "Very well. I'll kill the Cyclops." Danielle Moonstar confronts an awakening Blindfold and is very confused. Blindfold apologizes and points out that Donald Pierce is behind her. The other Young X-Men discuss Blindfold's vision and Dust's critical condition. Ink is surprised he is included in it as part of the team. Elsewhere, Donald Pierce ambushes Moonstar and Blindfold, and disappears.

Ink shaves his head and has a lightning bolt tattoo on it, assuming he will gain telepathy. Ink, Rockslide, and Wolf Cub lead an attack on the Hellfire Club to fight Cannonball and Sunspot. Graymalkin attacks Cyclops back at the Danger Cave, leaving the Young X-Men on their own. Wolf Cub wounds Sunspot, angering Cannonball. Graymalkin takes out the lights to the Danger Cave, saying it gives him more power. He then exposes Cyclops for who he really has been this whole time, Donald Pierce. Once both teams learn the truth, they go after Pierce, but arrive too late to save Wolf Cub, who was the then-unknown teammate that was killed in Blindfold's vision.

It is notable that the first story arc of Young X-Men echoes a narrative pattern first established with the inception of the New Mutants in their eponymous graphic novel, which was also echoed in the first story arc of New Mutants volume 2, which gave rise to the New X-Men series that is the immediate antecedent for Young X-Men.  All three of these storylines deal with the assembly of a new team of mutants, feature the cyborg Donald Pierce as the villain, and have one member of the team (Cannonball, Elixir, and Ink, in the respective stories) that initially works for Pierce before switching sides and joining the new team.  This story pattern was also followed, to some extent, in the New X-Men arc that appeared within the House of M timeline.  Further underscoring this continuity is the appearance of many of the original New Mutants in all three stories: as the protagonists in the New Mutants graphic novel, as teachers and mentors to the "new" New Mutants volume 2, and as the antagonists, the ersatz Brotherhood of Evil Mutants, in the arc in Young X-Men.

Graymalkin mentions a "Cypher" twice.  The first is when he is alone the air ducts inside of the Danger Cave.  He mentions that he is "not the only one that can help them.  There is Cypher."  The second time is when he tells Donald Pierce (who was disguised as Cyclops) that "Cypher told [him] everything.

Membership changes
After the adventure where Wolf Cub died, Cyclops asked Sunspot and Moonstar to teach the Young X-Men, they both accepted. Blindfold decided to leave the team, since she is no great contribution on the field of battle. Meanwhile Moonstar asked Anole, also a former member of New X-Men, to join the new team.

Ink finds out he is not a mutant at all. The artist who made his tattoos is in fact the one who gave Ink his powers, this tattoo artist is a mutant. Ink decides, since he is not a mutant, there is no place for him with the Young X-Men and leaves.

The new character, an African-American girl, reveals herself at the end of Young X-Men #8, however her codename is spelled "Cipher," rather than "Cypher" (as it is spelled in earlier mentions).  She had come to warn Ink that his teammates were in trouble and he is needed to come with her to save them.  Although Ink is very skeptical about this young girl's motivations or intentions, she is shown wearing the standard uniform of the Young X-Men, and has a jet from the X-Men's headquarters to transport him to his team as well, to show that her information is legitimate, even though she refuses to give any more information, about herself or the team, other than that.  However, she also gives into his demand to take him to his tattooist to give him some new abilities, even though she voices that she feels he is wasting his time while his friends are "dead or dying."  She is still able to get him to the battle with the Y-Men in time, though, where Ink is able to turn the tide and save his teammates.  Later that evening, Ink begins to ask Graymalkin about his connection to Cipher and just who she is, while Cipher, in a transparent form, spies on the two from the ceiling above.

Young X-Men Members

Cancellation
Young X-Men ended with issue #12, released in March 2009.

Characters

Creators

Writers
Marc Guggenheim - Young X-Men #1–12

Art
Yanick Paquette - Young X-Men #1–5 
Ben Oliver - Young X-Men #6–7, #10
Rafa Sandoval - Young X-Men #8–9, #11–12

Cover art
Terry Dodson and Rachel Dodson - Young X-Men #1–7
Michael Ryan - Young X-Men #8
Chris Bachalo - Young X-Men #9
Billy Tan - Young X-Men #10
Pasqual Ferry - Young X-Men #11–12

Collections

References

2008 comics debuts
2009 comics endings
X-Men titles
Marvel Comics superhero teams
Marvel Comics titles